Danioth is a surname. Notable people with the surname include:

Aline Danioth (born 1998), Swiss alpine ski racer
Heinrich Danioth (1896–1953), Swiss painter